Sons and Lovers is a 1913 novel by the English writer D. H. Lawrence. It traces emotional conflicts through the protagonist, Paul Morel, and his suffocating relationships with a demanding mother and two very different lovers, which exert complex influences on the development of his manhood. The novel was originally published by Gerald Duckworth and Company Ltd., London, and Mitchell Kennerley Publishers, New York. While the novel initially received a lukewarm critical reception, along with allegations of obscenity, it is today regarded as a masterpiece by many critics and is often regarded as Lawrence's finest achievement. It tells us more about Lawrence's life and his phases, as his first was when he lost his mother in 1910 to whom he was particularly attached. And it was from then that he met Frieda Richthofen, and around this time that he began conceiving his two other great novels, The Rainbow and Women In Love, which had more sexual emphasis and maturity.

Development and publication history

The third published novel of D. H. Lawrence, taken by many to be his earliest masterpiece, tells the story of Paul Morel, a young man and budding artist.

The original 1913 edition was heavily edited by Edward Garnett who removed 80 passages, roughly a tenth of the text. The novel is dedicated to Garnett. Garnett, as the literary advisor to the publishing firm Duckworth, was an important figure in leading Lawrence farther into the London literary world during the years 1911 and 1912. It was not until the 1992 Cambridge University Press edition was released that the missing text was restored.

Lawrence began working on the novel in the period of his mother's illness, and often expresses this sense of his mother's wasted life through his female protagonist Gertrude Morel. Letters written around the time of its development clearly demonstrate the admiration he felt for his mother – viewing her as a 'clever, ironical, delicately moulded woman' – and her apparently unfortunate marriage to his coal-miner father, a man of 'sanguine temperament' and instability. He believed that his mother had married below her class status. Lydia Lawrence wasn't born into the middle-class. This personal family conflict experienced by Lawrence provided him with the impetus for the first half of his novel – in which both William, the older brother, and Paul Morel become increasingly contemptuous of their father – and the subsequent exploration of Paul Morel's antagonising relationships with both his lovers, which are both incessantly affected by his allegiance to his mother.

The first draft of Lawrence's novel is now lost and was never completed, which seems to be directly due to his mother's illness. He did not return to the novel for three months, at which point it was titled 'Paul Morel'. The penultimate draft of the novel coincided with a remarkable change in Lawrence's life, as his health was thrown into turmoil and he resigned his teaching job to spend time in Germany. This plan was never followed, however, as he met and married the German minor aristocrat, Frieda Weekley, who was the wife of a former professor of his at the University of Nottingham. According to Frieda's account of their first meeting, she and Lawrence talked about Oedipus and the effects of early childhood on later life within twenty minutes of meeting.

The third draft of 'Paul Morel' was sent to the publishing house Heinemann; the response, a rather violent reaction, came from William Heinemann himself. His reaction captures the shock and newness of Lawrence's novel, 'the degradation of the mother [as explored in this novel], supposed to be of gentler birth, is almost inconceivable'; he encouraged Lawrence to redraft the novel one more time. In addition to altering the title to a more thematic 'Sons and Lovers', Heinemann's response had reinvigorated Lawrence into vehemently defending his novel and its themes as a coherent work of art. To justify its form, Lawrence explains, in letters to Garnett, that it is a 'great tragedy' and a 'great book', one that mirrors the 'tragedy of thousands of young men in England'.

Title
Lawrence rewrote the work four times until he was happy with it. Although before publication the work was usually titled Paul Morel, Lawrence finally settled on Sons and Lovers.

Plot summary

Part I 

The refined daughter of a "good old burgher family," Gertrude Coppard meets a rough-hewn miner, Walter Morel, at a Christmas dance and falls into a whirlwind romance characterised by physical passion but soon after her marriage to Walter, she realises the difficulties of living off his meagre salary in a rented house. The couple fight and drift apart and Walter retreats to the pub after work each day. Gradually, Mrs. Morel's affections shift to her sons beginning with the oldest, William.

As a boy, William is so attached to his mother that he does not enjoy the fair without her. As he grows older, he defends her against his father's occasional violence. Eventually, he leaves their Nottinghamshire home for a job in London, where he begins to rise up into the middle class. He is engaged, but he detests the girl's superficiality. William dies and Mrs. Morel is heartbroken. When her second son Paul catches pneumonia she rediscovers her love for Paul.

Part II 

Both repulsed by and drawn to his mother, Paul is afraid to leave her but wants to go out on his own, and needs to experience love. Gradually, he falls into a relationship with Miriam, a farmer's daughter who attends his church. The two take long walks and have intellectual conversations about books but Paul resists, in part because his mother disapproves. At Miriam's family's farm, Paul meets Clara Dawes, a young woman with, apparently, feminist sympathies who has separated from her husband, Baxter.

After pressuring Miriam into a physical relationship, which he finds unsatisfying, Paul breaks with her as he grows more intimate with Clara, who is more passionate physically. But even she cannot hold him and he returns to his mother. When his mother dies soon after, he is alone.

In Lawrence's own words 

Lawrence summarised the plot in a letter to Edward Garnett on 19 November 1912:

 It follows this idea: a woman of character and refinement goes into the lower class, and has no satisfaction in her own life. She has had a passion for her husband, so her children are born of passion, and have heaps of vitality. But as her sons grow up she selects them as lovers – first the eldest, then the second. These sons are urged into life by their reciprocal love of their mother – urged on and on. But when they come to manhood, they can't love, because their mother is the strongest power in their lives, and holds them. It's rather like Goethe and his mother and Frau von Stein and Christiana – As soon as the young men come into contact with women, there's a split. William gives his sex to a fritter, and his mother holds his soul. But the split kills him, because he doesn't know where he is. The next son gets a woman who fights for his soul – fights his mother. The son loves his mother – all the sons hate and are jealous of the father. The conflict goes on between the mother and the girl with the son as object. The mother gradually proves stronger, because of the ties of blood. The son decides to leave his soul in his mother's hands, and, like his elder brother go for passion. He gets passion. Then the split begins to tell again. But, almost unconsciously, the mother realises what is the matter, and begins to die. The son casts off his mistress, attends to his mother dying. He is left in the end naked of everything, with the drift towards death.

Literary significance and criticism

Jenny Turner described Sons and Lovers as a semi-autobiographical work in The Sexual Imagination from Acker to Zola: A Feminist Companion (1993). She maintained that it showed both "great candor" and "much self-pity". The critic Harold Bloom listed Sons and Lovers as one of the books that have been important and influential in Western culture in The Western Canon (1994). In 1999, the Modern Library ranked Sons and Lovers ninth on a list of the 100 best novels in English of the 20th century.

The novel contains a frequently quoted use of the English dialect word "nesh". The speech of several protagonists is represented in Lawrence's written interpretation of the Nottinghamshire dialect, which also features in several of his poems.

Film, TV and theatrical adaptations

Sons and Lovers has been adapted for the screen several times including the Academy Award winning 1960 film, a 1981 BBC TV serial and another on ITV1 in 2003. The 2003 serial has been issued on DVD by Acorn Media UK.

Standard editions

References

Sources

External links

 
 
 
 
 

British novels adapted into films
1913 British novels
British novels adapted into television shows
Modernist novels
Novels by D. H. Lawrence
Novels set in Nottinghamshire
Novels set in London
Psychological novels
Gerald Duckworth and Company books
Obscenity controversies in literature